Lycksele Airport  is a regional airport in Lycksele, northern Sweden.

Airlines and destinations

Statistics

See also
 List of the largest airports in the Nordic countries

References

Airports in Sweden
Buildings and structures in Västerbotten County